Linda Ahmat (born 1952) is a former Papua New Guinea international lawn bowler.

Ahmat won a silver medal in the Women's fours at the 1994 Commonwealth Games in Victoria with Cunera Monalua, Elizabeth Bure and Wena Piande. 

She has also competed in the fours event at the 2002 Commonwealth Games.

References

Living people
1952 births
Bowls players at the 1994 Commonwealth Games
Bowls players at the 2002 Commonwealth Games
Commonwealth Games silver medallists for Papua New Guinea
Commonwealth Games medallists in lawn bowls
Papua New Guinean female bowls players
Medallists at the 1994 Commonwealth Games